The 26th Alberta Legislative Assembly was in session from March 1, 2005, to February 4, 2008, with the membership of the assembly determined by the results of the 2004 Alberta general election held on November 22, 2004. The Legislature officially resumed on March 1, 2005, and continued until the fourth session was prorogued and dissolved on February 4, 2008, prior to the 2008 Alberta general election on March 3, 2008.

Alberta's twenty-sixth government was controlled by the majority Progressive Conservative Association of Alberta, led by Premier Ralph Klein until his resignation on December 24, 2006, after which he was succeeded by Ed Stelmach. The Official Opposition was led by Kevin Taft of the Liberal Party.  The Speaker was Ken Kowalski. In the list below, cabinet members' names are bolded; leaders of official parties are italicized.

This legislature had the distinction of being addressed by Elizabeth II, Queen of Canada, to help celebrate Alberta's centennial.

Party standings after 26th General Elections

 The Alberta Court of Appeal declared Thomas Lukaszuk the victor more than two months after the election.  The election-night vote count had given Chris Kibermanis of the Liberals a five-vote win, but the judicial recount gave Lukaszuk a three-vote margin of victory.
 A party requires four seats to have official party status in the legislature. Parties with fewer than four seats are not entitled to party funding although their members will usually be permitted to sit together in the chamber.

Notable events
 The province's centennial occurred during the 26th Legislature, on September 1, 2005. Earlier that year, on May 24, 2005, Elizabeth II made an official visit to the province in commemoration of the centennial.
 On March 1, 2006, premier Ralph Klein announced a series of controversial health care reforms which involved allowing greater levels of privatization in Alberta's public health care system. Later that day, the premier received significant media attention after throwing a book at a 17-year-old page.
 On March 15, 2006, and throughout the year, the Legislative Assembly celebrated the centennial of the first sitting of the Legislature.
 On April 6, 2006, Ted Morton introduced the controversial Bill 208, Protection of Fundamental Freedoms (Marriage) Statutes Amendment Act, 2006. Critics maintained that the bill removed limitations on free speech where homosexual individuals were concerned, potentially removing recourse for verbal abuse and discrimination. The bill died on the order paper on May 18, 2006.

Standings changes during the 26th Assembly

February 2, 2005 Chris Kibermanis, Edmonton Castle Downs removed from office after a judicial recount.
February 2, 2005 Thomas Lukaszuk, Edmonton Castle Downs becomes the MLA by court order.
March 22, 2006 Lyle Oberg, Strathmore-Brooks suspended from the Progressive Conservative caucus
July 25, 2006 Lyle Oberg, Strathmore-Brooks rejoins the Progressive Conservatives
January 15, 2007 Ralph Klein, Calgary-Elbow resigns
January 15, 2007 Shirley McClellan, Drumheller-Stettler resigns
June 12, 2007 Craig Cheffins, Calgary-Elbow elected in by-election
June 12, 2007 Jack Hayden, Drumheller-Stettler elected in by-election
November 20, 2006 Dan Backs, Edmonton Manning was expelled from the Liberal caucus.
September 27, 2007 Gary Mar, Calgary Mackay resigns to accept a government appointment.
January 19, 2008 Paul Hinman, Cardston-Taber-Warner forms the Wildrose Alliance caucus.

References

Further reading

External links
Alberta Legislative Assembly
Legislative Assembly of Alberta Members Book
By-elections 1905 to present

Terms of the Alberta Legislature
2004 in Canadian politics
2005 in Canadian politics
2006 in Canadian politics
2007 in Canadian politics
2008 in Canadian politics
2004 in Alberta
2005 in Alberta
2006 in Alberta
2007 in Alberta
2008 in Alberta